The Seattle City Council is the legislative body of the city of Seattle, Washington. The Council consists of nine members serving four-year terms, seven of which are elected by electoral districts and two of which are elected in citywide at-large positions; all elections are non-partisan. It has the sole responsibility of approving the city's budget, and develops laws and policies intended to promote the health and safety of Seattle's residents. The Council passes all legislation related to the city's police, firefighting, parks, libraries, and electricity, water supply, solid waste, and drainage utilities.
(The mayor of Seattle is not considered part of council.)

Members
Last election: November 2021

Notes

Elections
Election of city council members occur on odd-numbered years, with at-large seats staggered from district seats. City council members' terms begin January 1 although public ceremonies are held on the following Monday. The council positions are officially non-partisan and the ballot gives no party designations. Party identification is based on candidates' voluntary self-identification. Like other elections in Washington, all candidates run together in the primary with the top two progressing to the general election.

Candidates may participate in Seattle's unique democracy voucher program, which provides residents with vouchers to give candidates for public campaign funding.

Districts

Beginning in 2015, the geographic outline of the 7 districts and 2 citywide positions are as follows. Some neighborhoods overlap more than one district, indicated with an asterisk*. Redistricting will occur every 10 years starting in fall 2022.

History
Seattle was first incorporated as a town by an act of the Territorial Legislature on January 14, 1865. The town charter established a five-member board of trustees to govern Seattle, which appointed citizens to other positions. The act was repealed January 18, 1867, after most of the town's leading citizens petitioned for its dissolution. Seattle was again incorporated, this time as a City, on December 2, 1869. The new unicameral legislature, known as the Common Council, was elected at-large to one year terms. At-large election was replaced in 1884 by a system of 14 wards and four members elected at-large, all elected to two-year terms.

The Home Rule Charter, adopted in 1890, reorganized the city council into a bicameral legislature, with a nine-member Board of Aldermen and a sixteen-member House of Delegates.

District-based elections

In 2013, Seattle voters approved Charter Amendment 19 calling for the nine citywide Seattle City Council positions to be divided into seven district-elected seats and two citywide, at-large seats. The elections for the two at-large seats are held as separate contests, thus results are not proportional.

Each seat is filled in two-step process - a primary election is held in August, with the two most popular candidates going on to a general election in November.

The partial transition to districts started with 2013's elections for Positions 2, 4, 6, and 8 being truncated, two-year terms.

The first primary based on the new combined district/at-large system was held August 4, 2015. The first city council election based on the new system was held on November 3, 2015.

2015's election cycle featured all nine seats, except the seven district positions were elected to full, four-year terms and the two at-large positions would be for truncated, two-year terms.

The seven district seats are up for election again in 2023; the two at-large seats are up for election again in 2021.

Timeline
1869–1883 – Seven at-large Council members elected for one-year terms.
1884 – Nine Council members elected: three from each of the three wards, elected to two-year terms.
1886 – One ward added, Council reduced to eight members: two elected from each ward for two-years terms.
1890 – The Home Rule Charter established eight wards and bicameral legislature. A Board of Delegates composed of nine at-large members was elected for four-year terms.  House of Delegates had 16 members – Two from each ward, elected for two-year terms.
1892 – One ward added to make nine.  Both houses to have nine members – all elected from wards.
1896 – New Home Rule Charter reestablished unicameral legislature with nine wards.  One Council member elected from each ward for two years and four elected at large for four-year terms.
1905 – Two wards added to make 11.  One Council member from each with four at-large – 15 council members total.
1907 – The Charter was amended twice during the year, the first time adding two more wards, increasing the size of Council to 17.  Later, another ward was added (to make 14), increasing Council to 18 members.
1910 – The Charter was amended to abolish wards, reduce Council to nine at-large positions elected to three-year terms.  This took effect in 1911 and remained constant until 1946. The 1910 Charter amendments also made the elections non-partisan.  Prior to that candidates for Council (and other City offices) ran on party tickets.
1946 – The new Charter created the four-year term.
2013 – City voters pass measure changing councilmember elections to a mostly-district-based scheme.
2015 – First councilmember elections held under new combined district/at-large scheme.

Salary

In 2006, Seattle City Council salaries exceeded $100,000 for the first time. This made Seattle's city council among the highest paid in the United States, behind only Los Angeles and Philadelphia.

In 2010, Councilmembers Sally Bagshaw, Richard Conlin, Nick Licata and Mike O'Brien earn $117,533.52 annually. Councilmembers who were re-elected in 2011, Tim Burgess, Sally J. Clark, Jean Godden, Bruce Harrell, and Tom Rasmussen, will earn an annual salary of $119,976.48, effective January 1, 2012. Their salary will remain at this level through December 31, 2015.

In January 2017, salaries of councilmembers are authorized to be $59.08 per hour (councilmembers are paid monthly salaries, however the published compensation plan are presented as hourly rates). This is equivalent to an annualized pay of $123,359.04

, salaries of councilmembers are authorized to be $62.11 per hour, an increase of 5% from 2017. This is equivalent to an annualized pay of $129,685.68.

As of 2021, salaries of district councilmembers are authorized to be $65.32 per hour. Annually, councilmembers make as much as $140,000.

Council President 

The Seattle City Council picks among its peers a Council President to serve a two-year term, beginning January 1 of the year following an election.  The Council President serves as the official head of the City's legislative department.  In addition, they are tasked with:

 Establishing of committees and appointment of committee chairs and members.
 Presiding over meetings of the full council.
 Assuming the duties and responsibilities of Mayor if the Mayor is absent or incapacitated.

Notable past council members
 Paul J. Alexander, council member 1956-1969, newspaper publisher
 George Benson, promoter of the Waterfront Streetcar
 Bruce Chapman, council member 1971–1975, Secretary of State of Washington, Director of the United States Census Bureau, United States Ambassador to the United Nations Organizations in Vienna.
 Charlie Chong, council member 1996–1997, West Seattle populist
 Arthur A. Denny, council member 1877–1879, leader of the Seattle pioneers known as the Denny Party
 Bailey Gatzert, council member 1872–1873 and 1877–1878, in between was elected the city's first (and, the only) Jewish mayor
 Hiram Gill, council member 1898–1902, 1904–1910, then mayor. Famous as an "Open Town" advocate, he later allied with "Closed Town" reformers.
 Jean Godden, council member 2003–2015, newspaper columnist before her time on the council
 Bertha Knight Landes, council member 1922–1926, then elected the city's first female mayor
 David Levine, council member 1931–1962
 Wing Luke, council member 1962–1965, first Asian American elected official in Washington State
 John Miller, council member 1972–1979, later a Republican congressman
 A. W. Piper, pioneer, baker, socialist member 1877–1879. Eponym of Pipers Creek and Piper Orchard
 Norm Rice, council member 1978–1989, then elected the city's first African American mayor
 Peter Steinbrueck, council member 1997–2007, architect
Reginald H. Thomson, council member 1916–1922. City Engineer and visionary. Championed the Denny Regrade, 1904 Great Northern Tunnel, development of the Cedar River watershed, railroad, electricity and sewage infrastructure improvements and member of team that designed Lake Washington's first floating bridge.
Jeanette Williams, council member 1969–1989
 Henry Yesler, council member 1884–1885, Seattle pioneer, sawmill-owner, and twice mayor

Notes

External links

Archives
 Hugh DeLacy Papers. 1938–1985. 4.87 cubic feet (11 boxes, 1 map tube, 1 package). Contains records from DeLacy's service with the Seattle City Council from 1938–1939.
 Frederick G. Hamley Papers. 1933–1963. 6.83 cubic feet. Contains records from Hamley's service with the Seattle City Council from 1935–1936.
 Austin E. Griffiths Papers. 1891–1952. 11.73 cubic feet (25 boxes). Contains records from Griffiths' career as Settle city councilman from 1910–1913.

City Council
Washington city councils